Ollabelle is the self-titled debut album by New York act Ollabelle, released in 2004. It was produced by T-Bone Burnett.

Track listing

"Before This Time"
"Soul of a Man"
"Elijah Rock"
"Jesus on the Mainline"
"Get Back Temptation"
"I Am Waiting"
"Two Steps"
"No More My Lawd"
"Can't Nobody Do Me Like Jesus"
"The Storms Are on the Ocean"
"John the Revelator"
"I'm Willing to Run All the Way"
"I Don't Want to Be That Man"
"All Is Well"

References

2004 debut albums
Albums produced by T Bone Burnett